This is a list of flags used in Kyrgyzstan.

National flag and state flag

Governmental flags

Military flags

Regional flags

Political flags

Historical flags

Achaemenid Empire (540 B.C.-330 B.C.)

Sasanian Empire (224-350 and 563-642)

Hephthalite White Hunnic Empire (440-560)

Göktürk Khaganate (557-658 and 711-717)

Tibetan Empire (670-692 and 755-842)

Umayyad Caliphate (712-747)

Abbasid Caliphate (750-886)

Uyghur Khaganate (758-840)

Kara-Khanid Khanate (840-1212)

Ghaznavid Empire (1028-1042)

Seljuk Empire (1089-1101)

Khwarazmian Empire (1207-1220)

Mongol Empire (1220-1294)

Chagatai Khanate (1294-1347 and 1361-1363)

Golden Horde (1294-1446)

Timurid Empire (1370-1507)

Khanate of Bukhara (1506-1785)

Khanate of Kokand (1709-1876)

Qing Dynasty (1760-1864)

Emirate of Bukhara (1785-1870)

Russia (1870–1918)

Turkestan Autonomy (1917–1918)

Russian Soviet Republic (1918-1922) and Soviet Union (1922-1991)

Proposed flags

See also 
 Flag of Kyrgyzstan
 Emblem of Kyrgyzstan

References

External links

 
 Kyrgyzstan – Vexillographia

Flags of Kyrgyzstan
Lists and galleries of flags
Flags